Boury-en-Vexin (literally Boury in Vexin) is a commune in the Oise department in northern France.

Population

See also
 Communes of the Oise department
 Vexin
 Site de Boury-en-Vexin

References

Communes of Oise